Denys Molchanov and David Vega Hernández were the defending champions but chose not to defend their title.

Robin Haase and Albano Olivetti won the title after defeating Sanjar Fayziev and Sergey Fomin 7–6(7–5), 7–5 in the final.

Seeds

Draw

References

External links
 Main draw

JC Ferrero Challenger Open - Doubles